The 2022 FINA Artistic Swimming World Series began on 19 March 2022 with a virtual event jointly hosted by the United States and Canada and ended on 22 May 2022 with an onsite super final event in Athens, Greece. The series consisted of four legs across three continents and featured solo, duet, and team artistic swimming events in female, male, and mixed categories. It was the final edition to use the name FINA Artistic Swimming World Series preceding a change of competition name on 9 December 2022 to FINA Artistic Swimming World Cup for the 2023 edition.

Mixed gender team events featured up to two men per team. In December 2022, following the conclusion of World Series, the International Olympic Committee announced it would be allowing men to compete in artistic swimming for the first time only in mixed gender teams events at the 2024 Olympic Games, using the same format for team composition, up to two men, as the World Series.

From 21 April through the end of the World Series, athletes and officials from Russia and Belarus were banned from participating due to the 2022 Russia invasion of Ukraine.

Schedule
Originally the World Series was scheduled to include five legs across three continents, including a first ever joint hosting of a FINA Artistic Swimming World Series leg and a FINA Diving World Series leg in Kazan, Russia for the third leg in May 2022. However, due to the 2022 Russian invasion of Ukraine, which started on 24 February 2022, FINA canceled the leg of the World Series scheduled to take place in Kazan out of concern for the safety and well-being of participating athletes. To ensure the safety of participants, FINA required athletes and officials from Russia and Belarus to compete under neutral labels (no country name, flag, anthem, etc.) during competition. The designation "Independent FINA Athlete" (IFA) was the neutral term for competitors from the two countries. After initially allowing athletes and officials from both countries to participate as neutrals, FINA reversed its decision and banned the athletes and officials altogether effective 21 April 2022 through the end of competition. The updated schedule included the four non-canceled legs.

 Leg 1 was a virtual format with events competed between 19 and 25 February 2022 and performances webcast publicly with commentary on 19 and 20 March 2022.
 Leg 4 was a virtual format with events competed between 8 and 19 April 2022 and performances webcast publicly with commentary on 7 and 8 May 2022.

Medal summary
Each National Swimming Federation was permitted multiple entrants in individual and duet events, however, medals were awarded to the top three competitors in each event, with only the highest scoring competitor from each National Swimming Federation eligible for a final ranking and medal.

Medal table

Female

Solo technical routine

Solo free routine

Duet technical routine

Duet free routine

Team technical routine

Team free routine

Male

Solo technical routine

Solo free routine

Mixed

Duet technical routine

Duet free routine

Team highlight routine

 Team highlight routine were composed of up to two men, events composed of only women were all female events.

Team free combination

 Team free combination were composed of up to two men, events composed of only women were all female events.

Participating countries
Athletes from the following 40 countries competed in the World Series.

 (12)
 (3)
 (2)
 (6)
 (17)
 (10)
 (2)
 (1)
 (6)
 (10)
 (4)
 (13)
 (1)
 (2)
 (11)
 (11)
 Independent FINA Athletes (17)
 (12)
 (2)
 (2)
 (6)
 (14)
 (2)
 (2)
 (2)
 (2)
 (2)
 (2)
 (3)
 (8)
 (11)
 (2)
 (3)
 (12)
 (4)
 (7)
 (3)
 (2)
 (14)
 (2)

National Swimming Federation withdrawals
On 18 March 2022, the German Swimming Federation withdrew its athletes from the World Series. The German Swimming Federation rejoined the World Series in April on the fourth leg.

On 23 March 2022, the Russian Swimming Federation pulled all athletes from FINA events for the rest of the duration of the 2022 year, including the World Series. A little under one month later, on 21 April 2022, FINA banned all athletes and officials from Russia and Belarus from the World Series.

References

External links
 Official website

Synchronised swimming competitions
2022 in synchronized swimming
Sports events affected by the 2022 Russian invasion of Ukraine